Anthony Guy Marie Réveillère (born 10 November 1979) is a French former professional footballer who played as a right-back.

He spent most of his professional career with Rennes and Lyon, amassing Ligue 1 totals of 426 matches and five goals during 16 seasons and winning 12 major titles with the latter club, including five national championships.

Réveillère played 20 times with France, representing the nation at the 2010 FIFA World Cup and UEFA Euro 2012.

Club career

Rennes
Born in Doué-la-Fontaine, Maine-et-Loire, Réveillère finished his formation with Stade Rennais FC, making his Ligue 1 debut with the club on 3 February 1998 in a 0–0 away draw against SC Bastia. He spent six years with the team always in the top division, and was also loaned to Valencia CF in La Liga in January 2003.

Lyon
Réveillère joined Olympique Lyonnais in summer 2003, scoring one goal in 31 games in his first season to win the first of his consecutive five championships with the side. Except for the 2008–09 campaign, where he suffered an anterior cruciate ligament injury and could only feature in 19 league contests, he was always first-choice for L'OL.

Réveillère played in 77 UEFA Champions League matches during his tenure with Lyon (two goals), being present when his team ousted Real Madrid in the 2009–10 edition.

Napoli
On 8 November 2013, free agent Réveillère joined Italian side S.S.C. Napoli. He made his Serie A debut on 19 January of the following year by featuring the full 90 minutes in a 2–2 draw at Bologna F.C. 1909, and finished his only season with 18 appearances all competitions comprised.

Sunderland
On 23 October 2014, Réveillère signed with Premier League club Sunderland on a one-year deal. 

On 9 November 2015, he announced his retirement from professional football.

International career
Réveillère earned his first cap for France on 11 October 2003, in a 3–0 win against Israel for the UEFA Euro 2004 qualifiers. He was picked for the squads that competed at both the 2010 FIFA World Cup and Euro 2012, being an unused squad member in the former and appearing in the 0–2 quarter-final loss to Spain in the latter.

Réveillère scored his only goal for Les Bleus on 7 October 2011, contributing to a 3–0 home triumph over Albania for the Euro 2012 qualifying stage.

International goals
Score and result list France's goal tally first, score column indicates score after Réveillère goal.

Honours
Lyon
Ligue 1: 2003–04, 2004–05, 2005–06, 2006–07, 2007–08
Coupe de France: 2007–08, 2011–12
Trophée des Champions: 2003, 2004, 2005, 2006, 2007, 2012
Coupe de la Ligue runner-up: 2011–12

Napoli
Coppa Italia: 2013–14

Individual
Ligue 1 Team of the Year: 2010–11

References

External links

 
 
 
 
 
 
 
 

1979 births
Living people
Sportspeople from Maine-et-Loire
French footballers
Association football defenders
Ligue 1 players
Stade Rennais F.C. players
Olympique Lyonnais players
La Liga players
Valencia CF players
Serie A players
S.S.C. Napoli players
Premier League players
Sunderland A.F.C. players
France youth international footballers
France under-21 international footballers
France international footballers
2010 FIFA World Cup players
UEFA Euro 2012 players
French expatriate footballers
French expatriate sportspeople in Spain
Expatriate footballers in Spain
French expatriate sportspeople in Italy
Expatriate footballers in Italy
French expatriate sportspeople in England
Expatriate footballers in England
Footballers from Pays de la Loire